This is a list of diplomatic missions in Iceland. There are currently 14 embassies in Reykjavík.

Embassies in Reykjavík

Representative offices

Non-resident embassies

See also 
 List of diplomatic missions of Iceland

Notes

References 

Diplomatic missions in Iceland
Iceland
Diplomatic missions